The Emily & Theodore Hope Forest is a  permanent forest reservation located in Danbury, New Hampshire.

History
In 1987, Theodore S. Hope, Jr. and his wife Emily Blanchard Hope, who retired to Danbury after practicing corporate law in New York City for over 50 years, donated  of land to the New England Forestry Foundation.

In 1991,  of the donated land became part of the Society for the Protection of New Hampshire Forests. The land is named after Theodore and his wife Emily.

Recreational use
The main entry (gated) to the forest is located on Roy Ford Road in Danbury.  of hiking, with several hundred feet elevation change, is available via logging trails, with modest uphill bushwhacking.

References 

Protected areas of Merrimack County, New Hampshire
Forests of New Hampshire
Danbury, New Hampshire